Tany Youne (born Tatyana Stepanovna Maksimova-Koshkinsky; January 28, 1903; Cherby, Kazan province (now Yadrinsky District of Chuvash Republic) — October 6, 1977 Cheboksary, Chuvash ASSR) was a Soviet actress and writer. She was one of the first Chuvash film actresses and an outstanding figure of the Chuvash national culture. She was a member of the Union of writers of the USSR (1957).

Literary and translational activity
Since 1935 Tani Youne has started to work over transfer of the best samples of the Russian, Soviet and foreign literature. Together with I. Maksimov-Koshkinsky she has written some plays.

In 1972 she published her memoirs as : Days and years past. In the preface she wrote: «I Think … i am happy. Perhaps, not all of my life were executed. In my life there were many insults and bitterness. Therefore i am happy! Because I am an actress».

Awards
In 1973 for merits in development of the Chuvash literature and theatrical art and with the 70 anniversary Tany Youne has been awarded by the Certificate of honor republic committee of the CPSU and the Council of Ministers of Chuvash АSSR.

Literature
Антонов М., "Асран кайми йĕр хăварчĕ", Коммунизм ялавĕ. — 1983. — 28 кăрлач.
Орлов Г. Актриса, тăлмач / Г. Орлов // Ялав. — 1973. — № 1.
Родионов Л. "Актриса, тăлмачă, драматург", Коммунизм ялавĕ. — 1973. — 20 нарăс.
Антонов М., "Тани Юн — первая чувашская киноактриса", Советская Чувашия. — 1993. — 30 янв.
Игнатьева С., "Прекрасный дьявол" Чебоксарские новости. — 1993. — 28 янв.
Матвеева Г., "И стали мгновения историей", Советская Чувашия. — 2005. — 23 июля.
Романова Ф., "Театр, любимый народом", Чебоксары, 1973. — С. 79.

External links
 «Тани Юн» Телепередача Валерия Арсентьева, около 30 мин. яхăн, на чувашском языке.
 «Тани Юн юнĕ чĕрĕ» Статья в газете «Хыпар».
 Тани Юн Статья в газете «Питĕр чăвашĕсем»
 Тани Юн Статья на сайте «Немое кино».
 К 100-летию со дня рождения Тани Юн;
 Максимова-Кошкинская Татьяна Степановна (Тани Юн);
 Тани Юн — первая актриса чувашского кинематографа

1903 births
1977 deaths
Soviet film actresses
Chuvash writers
Soviet stage actresses